Douglas is a 1970 Norwegian drama film directed by Pål Bang-Hansen, starring Rolv Wesenlund and Kjersti Døvigen. It is based on a 1968 novel by Haavard Haavardsholm. The film presents a critical view of the activities of the secret police.

External links
 
 

1970 films
1970 drama films
Norwegian drama films
1970s Norwegian-language films